The following football clubs (soccer teams) cater to gay or lesbian members and have previously been, or are current member clubs of the IGLFA. Many of the clubs host multiple teams.

Argentina
 Los Dogos DAG
 S.A.F.G.

Australia
 Flying Bats Women's Football Club
 Sydney Rangers Football Club

Belgium
 Pink Devils Mechelen

Canada
 Downtown Soccer Toronto
 Montreal Queer Soccer Club
 Out For Kicks Vancouver Gay Soccer Club
 Toronto United

Czech Republic
 GFC Friends Prague

Denmark
 Pan Fodbold

France
 C.A.R.G.O.
 FC Paris Lutece
 Panamboyz United
 Paris Arc en ciel

Germany
 androGym
 anyway Hot Shots
 Ballboys Hamburg
 Cream Team Cologne
 Kicking Deerns
 Leinebagger Hannover
 Manndecker Frankfurt
 Queerschießer Osnabrück
 Rosa Panther Nürnberg
 Rosa Teufel
 SC AufRuhr
 SC Sternschanze
 Startschuss Hamburg
 Streetboys Munchen
 Stuttgart Ballboys
 Vorspiel Berlin
 Warminia Bielefeld 
 Weiberkram e.V.
 Wildboys Karlsruhe

Great Britain

 Bexley Invicta FC
 London Titans
 London Falcons GFC
 SOHO FC
 Stonewall F.C.
 Trowbridge Tigers
 Village Manchester FC
 Leftfooters FC

Iceland
 S.C. Styrmir

Ireland
 Dublin Devils F.C.
http://corkrebelsfc.com/

Italy
 King Kickers
 Black Angels Team
 Godado Mediolanum

Mexico
 AZKATL
 Colima
 DIDESEX AC
 Halcones Gay Sport Mexico
 Imperial MX
 Lobos Mexico
 Tri Gay
 Zorros

Russia
 FC Krylya
 Moscow Minders

Serbia
 Femslam Belgrade

Spain
 G Madrid Sports
 Panteres Grogues

Sweden
 Stockholm Snipers

United States
 Albany Empire
 Austin Goldstars
 Boston Strikers
 
Baltimore Queer Soccer Club

 CMSA Soccer Club (Chicago)
 Denver GLSC
 Denver Gay Soccer Goal Miners
 Dallas Oak Lawn Soccer Club
 Federal Triangles Soccer Club (Washington D.C.)
 Florida Storm Soccer Club
 Hotlanta Soccer Club
 Long Beach Waverunners FC
 Lobos USA
 Longbeach Waverunners
 Milwaukee Gay Football Club
 Minnesota Gray Ducks
 NetRippers F.C. (Portland)
 New York Ramblers
 Our For Kicks - Detroit Drive
 Philadelphia Falcons 
 Rain City Soccer Club (Seattle)
 San Diego Sparks
 San Francisco Spikes
 Twin Cities Jacks
 United F.C. (Florida)
 West Hollywood Soccer Club

References

International LGBT sports organizations